Francisco Sindreu Pons (9 March 1904 – 17 December 1982) was a Spanish tennis player. He competed in the men's singles event at the 1924 Summer Olympics.

References

External links
 

1904 births
1982 deaths
Spanish male tennis players
Olympic tennis players of Spain
Tennis players at the 1924 Summer Olympics
Tennis players from Barcelona